Emma Jensen is a rugby union player.

Emma Jensen may also refer to:

Emma Jensen (Big Brother)
Emma Jensen (screenwriter), writer of Mary Shelley and I am Woman